Aminobacter aminovorans is a Gram-negative soil bacteria.

References

External links
 J.P. Euzéby: List of Prokaryotic names with Standing in Nomenclature Genus Aminobacter
 Type strain of Aminobacter aminovorans at BacDive -  the Bacterial Diversity Metadatabase

Phyllobacteriaceae
Bacteria described in 1992